The Bolivian Cycling Federation (in Spanish: Federación Boliviana de Ciclismo) is the national governing body of cycle racing in Bolivia.

It is a member of the UCI and COPACI.

References

Cycle racing organizations
Cycle racing in Bolivia
Cycling